Microcomputer Associates, Inc., was an American computer company founded by Manny Lemas and Ray Holt.  It produced the low-cost Jolt Microcomputer, released in 1975. It was later acquired by semiconductor manufacturer Synertek, a second source manufacturer of the 6502, and renamed Synertek Systems. It then created the SYM-1, a 6502-based single board microcomputer and successor to the KIM-1. Holt designed the JOLT microcomputer. In 1978 the company offered a number of processor and peripheral modules.

References

1975 establishments in California
1978 disestablishments in California
1978 mergers and acquisitions
American companies established in 1975
American companies disestablished in 1978
Companies based in Santa Clara, California
Computer companies established in 1975
Computer companies disestablished in 1978
Defunct companies based in California
Defunct computer companies of the United States
Defunct computer hardware companies
Early microcomputers